The Museum David and Alice Van Buuren is a private house, now a museum, built from 1924 to 1928 for banker and art collector David Van Buuren and his wife Alice in Uccle, a municipality of Brussels, Belgium. The house was decorated by David and Alice as a total work of art to present their art collection in a rich Art Deco interior. The house is surrounded by gardens designed by Jules Buyssens in 1925 and René Pechère in 1968 and 1970. The private house became a museum in 1975 according to the testament of Alice Van Buuren. It was declared a National Heritage Site in 2001.

History
David Van Buuren (1886–1955) was born into a Jewish family in Gouda, Netherlands. He settled in Brussels in 1909 to become an important private banker. He married the Belgian Alice Piette (1890–1973) in 1922. David Van Buuren asked his nephew and architect Johan Franco to start working on the plan of his future house in Brussels. From 1924 to 1928, the Van Buurens commissioned the Belgian architects Léon Govaerts and Alexis Van Vaerenbergh to build their house on Léo Errera Avenue in Uccle following Franco's sketches. The outdoor architecture is typical of the Amsterdam School, while its Art Deco interior was decorated by Belgian, French and Dutch designers with rare furniture, carpets and stained-glass windows.

From 1928 to 1970, the Van Buurens hosted people such as Raoul Dufy, Jacques Prévert, René Lalique, Sergei Diaghilev, Erik Satie, René Magritte, David Ben-Gurion. The private house became a museum in 1975 according to the testament of Alice Van Buuren.

Collections

David Van Buuren decorated his house with paintings from James Ensor, Joachim Patinir, Pieter Bruegel the Elder, Hercules Seghers, Pieter Jansz Saenredam, Tsuguharu Foujita, Kees van Dongen, Vincent van Gogh, Henri Fantin-Latour, Rik Wouters, Gustave De Smet, Xavier Mellery en Constant Permeke. David was the patron of Belgian expressionist painter Gustave van de Woestijne. Van Buurens collections consists of 32 paintings of Van de Woestijne.

The living room is decorated with a rich collection of modernist carpets designed by the Dutch designer Jaap Gidding and a grand piano made of rosewood designed by Julius Blüthner. Jan Eisenloeffel designed the  Art Deco chandelier in the entrance hall.

On 16 July 2013, the paintings Shrimps and Shells of Belgian painter James Ensor and The Thinker by Dutch artist Kees Van Dongen and eight small works by old masters were stolen.

Garden
The gardens are an extension of the house, into which they seem to penetrate. They originally covered 26 ares (100m2) and now cover 1.5 ha. It is divided into three parts: the first one is "Picturesque Garden" designed by the landscape architect Jules Buyssens in 1924 that recalls the spirit of the Roaring Twenties and represents the geometrical ideas of the Art Deco. The second one, the "Labyrinth", is inspired by the Song of Salomon and decorated with seven sculptures by the Belgian sculptor André Willequet in 1968. The third one, "Garden of the Hearts",  was designed by Belgian landscape designer René Pechère in 1970 and brings a touch of romanticism to the park. There is a great harmony of style and time between the J. Buyssens's garden and the Art Deco house. 45 years later, Alice considered René Pechère's gardens as a complement of her villa. This jewel of greenery can be visited all year round.

See also
 Art Deco in Brussels

References

Bibliography

External links

 
 

Museums in Brussels
Art museums and galleries in Belgium
Van Buuren, David and Alice
Uccle
Protected heritage sites in Brussels
Historic house museums in Belgium
Art Deco architecture in Belgium
Buildings and structures completed in 1928
Museums established in 1975